The 1988 Big Sky Conference men's basketball tournament was the thirteenth edition, held  at Brick Breeden Fieldhouse at Montana State University in Bozeman, Montana.

Regular season champion Boise State defeated defending tournament champion and host  in the championship game,  to clinch their second Big Sky tournament. BSU had won the first conference tournament twelve years earlier.

Format
The Big Sky added  in the summer of 1987 to bring total conference membership to nine, but the last-place Eagles were ineligible for the postseason due to recruiting violations.

In the two previous conference tournaments, teams from the lower half of the standings won the title and were seeded sixteenth (last) in the West regional of the NCAA tournament. Montana State won in 1986 after tying for sixth in the standings. The next year, the top three seeds were upset in the first round (quarterfinals), and seventh-seed Idaho State won the title. The Bengals (15–15) met top-ranked UNLV (33–1) in the first round in Salt Lake City and were routed.

The Big Sky implemented a few changes to the bracket structure to reward regular season play. The top two teams in the league standings were given byes into the semifinal round, while the next two began play in the quarterfinals on Thursday. The remaining four teams (seeds 5–8) played an additional game on Wednesday; four victories in as many days were now required for a lower-half team to win the title.

The top four seeds advanced to the semifinals, and the tournament was won by the top-seed.

Bracket

NCAA tournament
Boise State (24–5) received the conference's automatic bid to the NCAA tournament, and no other Big Sky members were invited to the tournament or the NIT. The Broncos were the fourteenth seed in the West region and gave third-seeded Michigan a scare in Salt Lake City, as the Wolverines' large lead eroded in the second half; Michigan prevailed by

References

Big Sky Conference men's basketball tournament
Tournament
Big Sky Conference men's basketball tournament
Big Sky Conference men's basketball tournament
Basketball competitions in Montana
Sports in Bozeman, Montana
College sports tournaments in Montana